The Celtic Social Club is a musical band formed in 2013. It was led by Manu Masko.

The band is formed by a group of Bretons and Scots musicians, members of The Silencers, Red Cardell and Ronan Le Bars Group with guests related to the world Celtic, inspired by their elders of the Buena Vista Social Club and the New Orleans Social Club which aims to popularise Celtic music by opening it to current music.

The music of The Celtic Social Club is a contemporary adaptation of traditional Celtic tunes performed by a group of seven musicians and guests chosen for their diverse backgrounds such as rock, folk, blues, reggae or hip hop.

Biography

The idea of the Celtic Social Club was germinated in February 2012 when Manu Masko and Jean-Pierre Riou from the Breton band Red Cardell moved to New York City to mix an album with producer-mixer Ariel Borujow and when they watched a live video of the Fest-Rock (Bagad Kemper and Red Cardell) with him during a break. Ariel Borujow, interested, shared his discovery with Frequency, Eminem and Snoop Dogg, producer.

The group formed around the three musicians of Red Cardell (Jean-Pierre Riou, Manu Masko and Mathieu Péquériau), adding Jimme O'Neill singer and Irish-Scottish guitarist, leader of The Silencers and Ronan Le Bars virtuoso of Uilleann Pipes and fellow violinist Peter Stephan. Bassist Richard Puaud, longtime companion of Manu Masko, completed the team.

Other collaborators include the Jamaican Winston McAnuff (Scottish origin), the New Yorker rapper IC Will (Irish origin), the indie-folk singers Colline Hill (Breton resident first in Ireland and then in Belgium), Louise Ebrel, and Steven Bodénès the penn-soner (conductor) of Bagad Kemper, The Quimper pipe band.

During the showcase and the official press conference of the project on 4 April 2014 in Quimper, the Vieilles Charrues revealed the presence of the group as the creation of the year of the festival, 18 July between benefits of Tinariwen and Elton John. Keltia Musique announced its participation as coproducer with the release of an album on 18 June. 

The Celtic Social Club gave its first concert on 18 July 2014, in front of 50,000 spectators.

The collective began a tour early 2015 in Brittany and announced a French tour and dates in Switzerland (Geneva) and Germany (Rudolstdat).

In December 2015, Jean-Pierre Riou announced his departure from the group to focus exclusively on Red Cardell. A few days later The Celtic presented its new member in the person of Gouven Hamel, a Breton musician that played with Les Nus and Miossec.

In January 2016, the new team was in residence at La Sirène in La Rochelle to record new songs and prepare a 2016 tour including dates in Beijing and Shanghai. For these sessions the band appealed to producer John Reynolds (Sinéad O'Connor, he was her first husband, U2, Björk, Natacha Atlas).

Musical style 

The music of the Celtic Social Club is a modern adaptation of Celtic music from different territories (Brittany, Ireland, Scotland, Wales, Galicia, Asturias, Cornwall, Isle of Man). From traditional Celtic melodies from all sources, the group creates a musical synthesis of both contemporary and traditional.

Band members

Current members 

 Manu Masko (2013–present): drums, percussion, keyboard, samples, loops, backing vocals / art direction

 Ronan Le Bars (2013–present): Uilleann pipes, low whistle
 Pierre Stéphan (2013–present): fiddle
 Mathieu Péquériau (2013–present): harmonica, washboard, backing vocals
 Richard Puaud (2013–present): bass, backing vocals
 Goulven Hamel (2016–present): electric guitar, mandolin, banjo
 Taylor Byrne (2022-present): lead vocals, Acoustic guitar

Former member 
 Jean-Pierre Riou (2013–2015): lead vocals, twelve-string guitar, mandolin, banjo, bombard
 Jimme O'Neill (2013–2018): lead vocals, Acoustic and electric guitar
 Martin Kelly (2018): lead vocals, Acoustic and electric guitar
 Dan Donnelly (2018–2022): lead vocals, Acoustic and electric guitar

Guests 

 Winston McAnuff: lead vocals
 I.C. Will: lead vocals
 Faada Freddy: lead vocals
 Colline Hill: lead vocals, acoustic guitar
 Louise Ebrel: lead vocals
 Steven Bodénès: bombard
 Roy Harter: accordion

Discography

References

External links
 Official The Celtic Social Club website (English and French languages)
 Official Manu Masko website (French language)

Breton musical groups
Musical groups established in 2013
2013 establishments in Scotland